Mycosphaerella areola is a plant pathogen infecting cotton.

See also
 List of Mycosphaerella species

References

areola
Fungi described in 1932
Cotton diseases
Fungal plant pathogens and diseases